Shyam Goenka (born 7 March 1963 in Janakpur) is the founder of Nepal's first broadsheets in the Non-Government sector, christened Kantipur and The Kathmandu Post. He is a champion and an ardent believer in the sanctity of the free press and in democratization in Nepal.

Kantipur 
In February 1993, exactly two years after Nepal's constitution was amended to permit a free press, Kantipur and The Kathmandu Post were founded by Shyam Goenka, when he was 27 years old. In fact, he had taken the initiative to start the newspapers, with very limited resources, when just about everybody dismissed his efforts to start a private media house as a bad business move. However, Kantipur defied all naysayers and went on to write a history of its own – perhaps the greatest success story for a corporate in Nepal, post 1990. Within only a few days of their existence, the two newspapers, Kantipur and The Kathmandu Post, went on to garner unmatched readership in the country, becoming the largest circulated and read newspapers in the history of Nepal with an estimated 75 to 80 percent share at the time. This was certainly a feat in itself because nowhere in the world, had a newspaper become the country's leading daily, by acquiring such loyalty from readers in such a short span of time. This was in stark contrast to the fact that two major Indian industrialists of that time, the Ambanis and the Thapars had also promoted two dailies of their own, at the same time and with huge resources and marketing, but failed to achieve much success, proving to an extent that acquiring newspaper readership and loyalty require much more than merely money and advertisement. Even today, the leading daily of India commands nothing more than 10 percent of the readership in the country; again, nowhere closer to the kind of leadership Kantipur enjoys in readership and circulation in Nepal.

Despite its success, Kantipur was not being given any government advertisements, something that was crucial for sustenance of the newspaper. Thus, due to financial crisis and in order to prevent the employees from losing their jobs, Shyam Goenka ended up transferring his shares to Binod Gyawali and Kailash Sirohiya of the Namaste Group, hereby, handing over the reigns of the media house to them and renouncing ownership of Kantipur and The Kathmandu Post therein.

However, with the initiatives of Shyam Goenka and Kantipur, print media in the Nepalese private sector not only succeeded in acquiring credibility—a tag that until 1993, was monopolized by the government-owned Gorkhapatra and the Rising Nepal—but also promoted professionalism in journalism to a great extent attracting talents to join in. The two newspapers, Kantipur and The Kathmandu Post have not only been one of the strongest contributors to the institutionalization of democracy and freedom in Nepal, but encouraged empowerment of the Nepalese milieu at large. In Nepal, today, journalism has become one of the most loved and sought after professions for the young literate milieu.

See also
 Kantipur Publications
 Kantipur
 The Kathmandu Post
 Narayan Wagle

References

1963 births
Living people
Nepalese activists
History of Nepal (1951–2008)
People from Janakpur
Nepalese company founders